Bagdad Airport  is a county-owned public-use airport located  northeast of the central business district of Bagdad, in Yavapai County, Arizona, United States.

History 
At least at one point during its history, Bagdad airport had commercial airline service, with Desert Pacific Airlines flying from Lake Havasu City and Prescott, both in Arizona, during 1979.

Facilities and aircraft 
It has one runway designated 5/23 with a 4,575 by 60 ft (1,394 x 18 m) asphalt surface. For the 12-month period ending May 3, 2007, the airport had 1,000 aircraft operations, an average of 83 per month, all of which were general aviation.

References

External links 

Airports in Yavapai County, Arizona